Events from the year 1821 in Russia

Incumbents
 Monarch – Alexander I

Events

 Ukase of 1821
 Novo-kamenniy Bridge

Births

 - Mikhail Petrashevsky, Russian revolutionary and Utopian theorist. (d. 1866)
 - Fiódor Dostoievski, Russian novelist, short story writer, essayist, journalist and philosopher. (d. 1881)

Deaths

References

1821 in Russia
Years of the 19th century in the Russian Empire